The Crime of Dr. Crespi is a 1935 American  horror film starring Erich von Stroheim, Paul Guilfoyle, Jeanne Kelly, Dwight Frye, Harriet Russell, and John Bohn. It was released by Republic Pictures.

The movie was filmed at Biograph Studios in The Bronx, New York and is loosely based on the Edgar Allan Poe short story, "The Premature Burial".

Plot
Dr. Andre Crespi (von Stroheim) hates Dr. Stephen Ross (Bohn), who married Crespi's girlfriend, Estelle  (Harriet Russell). During surgery, Ross appears to die. Crespi has given Ross a drug that induces a state of apparent death, while Ross retains all of his senses. Dr. John Arnold (Guilfoyle) is then asked to exhume Ross by the suspicious Dr. Thomas (Frye). They exhume the body and return to the hospital to prove he was poisoned.  Ross awakens from the drug while on the autopsy table.

Cast 
 Erich von Stroheim — Dr. Andre Crespi
 Harriet Russell — Estelle Gorham Ross
 Dwight Frye — Dr. Thomas
 Paul Guilfoyle — Dr. John Arnold
 John Bohn (stage name of Charles Frederick Herendeen)	as Dr. Stephen Ross
 Geraldine Kay as Miss Rexford
 Jean Brooks as Miss Gordon
 Patsy Berlin as Jeanne Ross
 Joe Verdi as Di Angelo
 Dean Raymond as Minister

Reception

In their 1936 review of the film, The New York Times gave the film a negative review, calling it "an almost humorously overstrained attempt at grimness". The reviewer criticized Stroheim as being "unconvincing", and uninspired cinematography; stating that Frye's performance was the film's only redeeming presence.

See also
List of horror films of the 1930s

References

External links

 
 
 

1935 films
1935 horror films
American black-and-white films
American horror films
1930s English-language films
American films about revenge
Films based on works by Edgar Allan Poe
Films directed by John H. Auer
Republic Pictures films
1930s American films